Yin Guifang (1 December 1919 – 1 March 2000) was a Chinese Yue opera singer-actress who played Sheng roles (i.e. male characters), sometimes known as the "Empress of Yue opera". Born into a poor family in Xinchang County, Zhejiang, Yin began her career at age 10 and rose to one of the biggest stars in 1940s Shanghai.

Like many artists, Yin Guifang was tortured during the Cultural Revolution (1966–1976) which left half her body permanently paralyzed. After the Cultural Revolution, she continued to work in Yue opera despite her disability. In the 1980s she groomed a number of young singers who later became leading figures in Yue opera, among them Mao Weitao, Zhao Zhigang, Wang Jun'an and Xiao Ya.

References

1919 births
2000 deaths
Yue opera actresses
Victims of the Cultural Revolution
20th-century Chinese actresses
20th-century Chinese women singers
Singers from Zhejiang
People from Xinchang County
Actresses from Shaoxing
Male impersonators in Yue opera
Musicians from Shaoxing
People of the Republic of China